Elections to Baseball Hall of Fame for 1960 followed a system established after the 1956 election. The Veterans Committee was meeting only in odd-numbered years (until 1962). For the third time, the induction ceremonies in Cooperstown, New York, were canceled because there was no one to induct. This would be the last time until  that no one was selected for induction to the Hall.

BBWAA election
The BBWAA was authorized to elect players active in 1930 or later, but not after 1954. All 10-year members of the BBWAA were eligible to vote.

Voters were instructed to cast votes for up to 10 candidates; any candidate receiving votes on at least 75% of the ballots would be honored with induction to the Hall. A total of 134 players received votes; 269 ballots were cast, with 202 votes required for election. A total of 2,288 individual votes were cast, an average of 8.51 per ballot.

Candidates who were eligible for the first time are indicated here with a dagger (†). Candidates who have since been elected in subsequent elections are indicated in italics.

Copies of the 1958 and 1960 ballots are not available, reportedly listing "about 400" and 237 players, respectively. Eight candidates may have received votes for the first time who were previously eligible: Miller, White, Kress, Crowder, Danning, Keltner, Walberg, and Zachary (in table order). The votes for Ralph Kiner may have been write-ins; he played until 1955 and should have been ineligible.  Lefty Grove received six votes despite the fact that he had already been elected to the Hall of Fame, in 1947.

The next ballot for 1962 did not include a list of names. Twenty-six candidates who received at least one vote in 1960 may have been eligible for the final time: Edd Roush, Hank Gowdy, Bucky Harris, Dave Bancroft, Joe Sewell, Nick Altrock, Joe Judge, Howard Ehmke, Eddie Rommel, Wally Schang, Cy Williams, Bob Meusel, Joe Dugan, Babe Herman, Lew Fonseca, Mike González, Marty McManus, Jack Quinn, Bill Sherdel, Sparky Adams, Ray Blades, Heinie Groh, Bubbles Hargrave, Addie Joss, Freddy Leach and Hans Lobert.

References

External links
1960 Election at www.baseballhalloffame.org

Baseball Hall of Fame balloting
Hall of Fame balloting